Sehn is a surname. Notable people with this surname include:

 Eric Sehn (born 1984), Canadian diver
 Jan Sehn (1909–1965), Polish lawyer and professor

See also
 Sen (surname)
 Senn
 Seon (Korean name)